Frank Andrew McCormick (June 9, 1911 – November 21, 1982) was an American baseball first baseman who played fifteen seasons in Major League Baseball (MLB). Nicknamed "Buck" in honor of Frank Buck, he played for the Cincinnati Reds, Philadelphia Phillies and Boston Braves from 1934 to 1948.

McCormick signed with the Cincinnati Reds as an amateur free agent in 1934 and played for their minor league affiliate in Beckley until September of that same year, when the Reds promoted him to the major leagues. After spending twelve seasons with the organization, McCormick was sold to the Philadelphia Phillies, where he spent the next two seasons. In the middle of the 1947 season, he was released and subsequently joined the Boston Braves, with whom he played his last game on October 3, 1948. He is most famous for winning the National League Most Valuable Player Award in 1940, the second of three consecutive years where a Red won the award. The Reds were only the second team to ever have a player on the roster win the award in three straight seasons (the first was the Philadelphia Athletics, who did so from 1931 to 1933) and the first to do so with three separate players, which has only been accomplished three times since.

Early life
McCormick was born on June 9, 1911 in New York City. His father, Andrew McCormick, was a railroad worker. As a child, he played sandlot ball and participated in baseball at his high school and church's leagues, playing in the outfield. He made the decision to play professional baseball at seventeen and tried out for several major league teams. After he was rejected by the Philadelphia Athletics, Washington Senators and New York Giants, in 1934, he took a $50 loan from his uncle in order to go to the Cincinnati Reds' tryout held in Beckley, West Virginia.

McCormick's manager at the sandlot team encouraged him to switch positions to first base, citing how there was less competition for the spot compared to the outfield. His performance at the tryout left a lasting impression on former major league player and renowned scout Bobby Wallace, who signed the 23-year-old.

Professional career

Minor leagues
McCormick began his professional baseball career for the Beckley Black Knights, a minor league baseball team that were members of the Middle Atlantic League. In 120 games played and 487 at bats that season, he posted a batting average of .347 and garnered 169 hits. His stellar performance that year earned him a promotion to the major leagues. After he was exiled back to the minors, he split the  season between five teams—the Dayton Ducks, Decatur Commodores, Nashville Volunteers, Fort Worth Cats and Toronto Maple Leafs—and batted .277 and made 121 hits throughout the entire season. In , he moved to the Durham Bulls, a minor league baseball team that competed in the Piedmont League. He began the season in a disappointing fashion before his manager, Johnny Gooch, advised him to modify his batting grip. The change helped McCormick tremendously, as he led the league with a .381 batting average that season and finished with 211 hits, 49 doubles and 15 home runs.

Cincinnati Reds
McCormick made his major league debut for the Reds on September 11, 1934, at the age of 23, entering the game as a pinch-hitter for pitcher Ray Kolp in a 5–2 loss against the Brooklyn Dodgers. He played just 12 games with the Reds and though he batted .313 in 16 at-bats, he was demoted to the minor leagues, where he was consigned for the next two seasons. In his first day back with the team, he amassed seven hits in a doubleheader and finished the season with a .325 batting average in 83 at-bats.

McCormick became the Reds' full-time first baseman from  onwards, replacing Buck Jordan. That year, he had 106 runs batted in (RBI), finished third in the National League in batting average (.327) and led the majors in hits with 209. In recognition of his brilliant performance in his first full year in the major leagues, McCormick was named the unofficial "Rookie of the Year" by the Associated Press.

The  season saw another strong showing from McCormick both offensively and defensively. He led the National League in hits (209), drove in 128 RBIs to become the league's RBI champion and finished first in fielding percentage at first base (.996). His impressive performance during the latter half of the season was recognized as being a key factor in the Reds' drive to win the pennant. The Reds advanced to the 1939 World Series, where they lost to the New York Yankees in a four-game sweep. In spite of his team's performance, he was still able to maintain a .400 batting average throughout the series. His contributions to the team that year led to him being accepted into the "Jungle Club" of Reds' infielders, who gave him the nickname "Wildcat".

Career summary
In a 13-season career, McCormick posted a .299 batting average with 1,711 hits, 128 home runs and 951 runs batted in in 1,534 games played. An excellent first baseman, his career fielding percentage was .995.

That season, he led the league in hits (191) and doubles (44) as the Reds stormed to their second consecutive National League championship and the 1940 World Series title. McCormick was selected to the NL All-Star team for nine straight seasons (1938–1946, although there was no game played in ). McCormick also led his league in hits two other times (1938–1939, with 209 each season) and in RBI in 1939 (with 128). He topped all NL first basemen in fielding percentage four times in 1939, 1940, 1941, and 1946. In three World Series (1939–1940 with the Reds and 1948 with the Braves), he batted .271 with 13 hits in 14 games played.

He is one of only three NL players with three consecutive hits titles. The others are Ginger Beaumont (1902–04) and Rogers Hornsby (1920–22). McCormick set an MLB first basemen record with 138 straight errorless games (1945–46). He is a member of the Cincinnati Reds Hall of Fame.

Personal life 
At the conclusion of his 1938 rookie season, McCormick married his wife Vera (née Preedy) on October 8. Together, they had two daughters, Judith and Nancy.

Death 
McCormick died of cancer on November 21, 1982 in Manhasset, New York at the age of 71. He was interred at the Cemetery of the Holy Rood in Westbury, New York.

See also

 List of Major League Baseball annual runs batted in leaders
 List of Major League Baseball annual doubles leaders

References

Further reading
 Honig, Donald (1975) Baseball When the Grass Was Real: Baseball from the Twenties to the Forties Told by the Men Who Played It. New York: Coward, McGann & Geoghegan. pp. 237–247. .

External links

1911 births
1982 deaths
American Roman Catholics
Beckley Black Knights players
Boston Braves players
Burials at the Cemetery of the Holy Rood
Cincinnati Redlegs coaches
Cincinnati Reds announcers
Cincinnati Reds players
Cincinnati Reds scouts
Dayton Ducks players
Deaths from cancer in New York (state)
Decatur Commodores players
Durham Bulls players
Fort Worth Cats players
Lima Phillies players
Major League Baseball broadcasters
Major League Baseball first basemen
Nashville Vols players
National League All-Stars
National League Most Valuable Player Award winners
National League RBI champions
Philadelphia Phillies players
Quebec Braves players
Baseball players from New York City
Syracuse Chiefs players
Toronto Maple Leafs (International League) players